KNVU-LP is a low power radio station that broadcasts a Spanish language religious format licensed to Victorville, California.

History
KNVU-LP began broadcasting on November 21, 2014.

References

External links
 

Victorville, California
2014 establishments in California
NVU-LP
Radio stations established in 2014
NVU-LP